The Plant is a British television movie by Jonathan Lewis. It was first broadcast on the BBC in January 1995.

Synopsis
In a garden in a London suburb, corpses sprout out of the earth on during a live television gardening programme called Down to Earth. However, it soon appears that these human bodies are not dead people, they are grown there, like plants. The question is who is growing these bodies and for which purpose.

Cast
Joanna Roth — Connie 
Valentine Pelka — Max 
Eoin McCarthy — Tom Collins 
Clive Francis — DCI Pinker 
Tim Preece — Alan 
Sally Dexter —   Bella

References

External links

1995 television films
1995 films
British television films